Hemmatabad (also Romanized as  also Romanized as Hemmatābād and Himmatābād; also known as Hemmatābād-e Shahr Kohneh, Hemmatābād-e Zamānābād, and Unafābād) is a city in Taghenkoh District, Firuzeh County, Razavi Khorasan Province, Iran. At the 2006 census, its population was 1,264, in 345 families.

References 

Populated places in Firuzeh County
Cities in Razavi Khorasan Province